"Ring of Fire" is a song written and performed by Duane Eddy.  The song reached #17 on the UK Singles Chart and #84 on the Billboard Hot 100 in 1961.

The song appears in the 1961 movie, Ring of Fire.

References

1961 songs
1961 singles
Songs written by Duane Eddy
Duane Eddy songs
Jamie Records singles
Songs written for films